Bensbach's bird-of-paradise, also known as  Bensbach's riflebird, is a bird in the family Paradisaeidae that is often now considered an intergeneric hybrid between a magnificent riflebird and lesser bird-of-paradise. However, some authors, such as Errol Fuller, believe that it was a distinct and possibly extinct species.

History
Only one adult male specimen is known of this bird, held in the Netherlands Natural History Museum and coming from the Arfak Mountains of north-western New Guinea.  It is named after Jacob Bensbach, Dutch Resident at Ternate, who presented the specimen to the museum.

Notes

References
 
 

Hybrid birds of paradise
Birds of New Guinea
Intergeneric hybrids